The Georgia State Panthers men's soccer team represents Georgia State University (GSU) in all NCAA Division I men's college soccer competitions. As of the 2022 season, the Panthers play in their full-time home of the Sun Belt Conference (SBC), which reinstated the sport after a one-season hiatus. During the SBC's men's soccer hiatus, GSU had been a single-sport member of the Mid-American Conference. However, following a major conference realignment in 2021 and 2022 brought several new men's soccer schools to the SBC, that league announced it would reinstate men's soccer no later than 2023, eventually moving that date forward to 2022.

Coaching staff 
As of May 27, 2021. Number of seasons includes the upcoming fall 2021 season.

Championships

Conference regular season championships

Conference tournament championships

Rivalries 
Georgia State's main rival is Georgia Southern. The multi-sports rivalry is known as "Modern Day Hate". State and Southern remain conference rivals in men's soccer, as Southern moved that sport to the MAC along with State before the SBC reinstated men's soccer in 2022.

Record against Sun Belt opponents

Coaching records

Postseason

NCAA tournament results 
Georgia State has appeared in five NCAA Tournaments. Their combined record is 1–4–1.

Stadiums 
The Panthers play most of their games at the 1,500-capacity GSU Soccer Stadium.  However, they have played some matches at the nearby Center Parc Stadium, normally home to GSU football, in Atlanta.

See also 
 Georgia State Panthers women's soccer

References

External links 
 

 
Association football clubs established in 1967
1967 establishments in Georgia (U.S. state)